Omalus is a genus of cuckoo wasps in the family Chrysididae.

Selected species
Species within this genus include:
 Omalus aeneus (Fabricius, 1787) 
 Omalus biaccinctus (R. du Buysson, 1892)
 Omalus chlorosomus Lucas 1849
 Omalus nigromaculatus  Linsenmaier, 1997 
 Omalus politus R. du Buysson, 1887

Biography
Bohart, R.M. & Campos, L.E. (1960) A review of the genus Omalus Panzer in North America. (Hymenoptera, Chrysididae). — Annals of the Entomological Society of America, 53 (2), 232–250.

References

Hymenoptera genera
Hymenoptera of Europe
Chrysidinae